NK Nosteria is a Croatian association football club founded in 1921 and based in the small town of Nuštar. As of the 2009–10 season they compete in the Vukovar-Syrmia County League, 5th division in the Croatian football league system.

Association football clubs established in 1921
Football clubs in Croatia
Football clubs in Vukovar-Srijem County
1921 establishments in Croatia